Tripuraneni Maharadhi (20 April 1930 – 23 December 2011) was an Indian Telugu film, screenplay, dialogue and script writer. He is remembered for his political forays, as well as for the film Alluri Seetharama Raju. He was the de facto director for all the scripts he wrote. His son Varaprasad Tripuraneni is a film maker and a prominent BJP politician.

Role in politics                           
Maharadhi is to some degree, linked to every political party in the Telugu political frame and was instrumental in the launch of the TDP. He was the first person to come up with the idea of a regional party in A.P after which he started a campaign namely 'Telugu Tejam' as prospective title for a regional party, it consisted of a 16-point agenda which included the famous phrase "Telugu Valla Atma Gauravam" which later N.T.R used to a great extent to promote T.D.P'S political vision. Maharadhi vehemently proposed Telugu tejam to fill the then existing political vacuum and also to establish a political identity for Telugu people (ref : Marosari maranisthunna NTR and NTR punarudhaanam); later  a few intellectuals joined this crusade and soon it attracted many visionaries into this movement. Maharadhi along with the few intellectuals decided that a sammohan shakti is required to counter the charisma of Indira Gandhi, hence in that process N.T.R was finally convinced to join the initiative wherein he took over the reins and finally Telugu Tejam was named as Telugu desam to fight the next electoral battle. 
                         
Maharadhi also served as Andhra Pradesh Congress State Secretary when Y. S. Rajasekhara Reddy was Andhra Pradesh Congress president. In this position, he was instrumental in promoting YSR in the east and west Godavari districts in Y.S Rajasekhara Reddy's early days. When the Bharatiya Janata Party came into existence, he served briefly as a National Council member.  In 2004, Maharadhi launched his own political party 'Trilinga Praja Pragathi' (TPP) with the slogan 'Badugu vargala rajyadhikaram' (power to the weaker sections of the society).

Works

Filmography and written works
Sathi Arundhati
Kanchukota
Yodhanu Yodhulu (1961)
Ranabheri*
Niluvu Dhopidi
Pethandhaarl
Simhasanam
Devudu Chesina Manushulu
Bandipotu 
Kanchukota 
Niluvu Dopidi 
Pettandarlu 
Desoddharakulu 
Devudu Chesina Manushulu 
Paadi Pantalu 
Kurukshetram 
Ram Robert Raheem 
Hema Hemeelu 
Praja Rajyam 
Simhasanam 
Santhi Sandesam
Plus 150 scripts to his credit.

As producer
Desamante manushuloye (1971)
Bogimantalu (1982)
Raithu Bharatam (1994)
Vandikaara Magan*
Manchini penchaali*

References 

Filmfare Awards South winners
Telugu screenwriters
1930 births
2011 deaths
Screenwriters from Andhra Pradesh
Film producers from Andhra Pradesh
20th-century Indian dramatists and playwrights
Indian male screenwriters
20th-century Indian male writers